William Alexander Linn (born Sussex, New Jersey, 4 September 1846; died 23 February 1917) was a United States journalist and historian.

Biography
He graduated from Phillips Academy, Andover, Massachusetts, in 1864, at Yale in 1868, and in 1883 was admitted to the New York bar. From 1868 to 1891, he was engaged in newspaper work, during part of that time being on the staff of the New York Tribune, and was managing editor of the Evening Post, 1891–1900, resigning to devote himself to literary work.

He was president of the Hackensack Mutual Building and Loan Association from its organization in 1887 and was president of the People's National Bank of Hackensack, New Jersey, from its organization in 1903 to 1916. He was president of the First National Bank of Ridgefield Park, New Jersey, from its organization in 1910 to 1913. He was elected county collector of Bergen County, New Jersey, 3 January 1916. He was a member of the New Jersey Commission of 1899 which secured the legislation under which the Palisades Interstate Park Commission, which has saved the Palisades front from destruction, was appointed, and was a member of the latter commission from its organization to 1913. He was a member of the National Geographic Society, the New Jersey Historical Society, Bergen County Historical Society, and trustee of the Johnson Public Library of Hackensack.

Linn was a resident of Hackensack, New Jersey.

Works
 The Story of the Mormons (1902) at Google Books; at archive.org
 Horace Greeley (1903) at perseus.tufts.edu
 Rob and His Gun (1902)

Notes

References

External links
 
 

1846 births
1917 deaths
American male journalists
Phillips Academy alumni
People from Hackensack, New Jersey
People from Sussex, New Jersey
Yale University alumni
Historians from New Jersey